The Municipality of Pivka is a municipality in Slovenia in the Pivka Basin in the Littoral–Inner Carniola Statistical Region. Its seat is the town of Pivka. It belongs to the traditional region of Inner Carniola.

Settlements
In addition to the municipal seat of Pivka, the municipality also includes the following settlements:

 Buje
 Čepno
 Dolnja Košana
 Drskovče
 Gornja Košana
 Gradec
 Juršče
 Kal
 Klenik
 Mala Pristava
 Nadanje Selo
 Narin
 Neverke
 Nova Sušica
 Palčje
 Parje
 Petelinje
 Ribnica
 Selce
 Šilentabor
 Slovenska Vas
 Šmihel
 Stara Sušica
 Suhorje
 Trnje
 Velika Pristava
 Volče
 Zagorje

History
Although the Pivka region has been a strategically important location since ancient times, it became even more important with the construction of the Vienna–Trieste railway (the Austrian Southern Railway) in 1857 and the Št. Peter na Krasu–Rijeka railway twenty years later. In 1930, while it was under the Italian control, the strategic hills over the town of Pivka were heavily fortified and included in the Alpine Wall system of defenses, which stretched from the Bay of Genoa to the Kvarner Gulf. Št. Peter na Krasu and the nearby barracks in Hrastje ("Crastie di San Pietro" then, now part of the town of Pivka) were one of the strongest points in the eastern section of the Alpine Wall.

Military History Park
On the basis of this military history from ancient times to the 20th century, the Municipality of Pivka has arranged the Pivka Park of Military History, with many tanks and artillery, a small aircraft collection, and a former Yugoslav Una-class commando submarine. The municipality hopes to develop the park into a tourism destination that will complement alongside Postojna Cave and other local attractions. The first military re-enactment was staged in the park in September 2007.

References

External links

Municipality of Pivka on Geopedia
Pivka municipal site

 
1994 establishments in Slovenia
Postojna